Simon Ernst (born 2 April 1994) is a German handball player, currently playing for SC DHfK Leipzig Handball and the German national team.

Achievements
European Championship:
: 2016

Individual awards
2015 Men's Junior World Handball Championship All Star Team: Left back

References

1994 births
Living people
German male handball players
People from Düren
Sportspeople from Cologne (region)
Handball-Bundesliga players
VfL Gummersbach players